456 Montgomery Plaza is a , 26-story class-A office skyscraper on Montgomery Street in the Financial District of San Francisco, California.

History
456 Montgomery, completed in August 1985, is a 26-story steel frame high-rise office tower rising above two circa 1907 landmark granite banking facades. Serving as the primary building entrance at 456 Montgomery is the former bank of Borel & Co., designed by Albert Pissis, while at the corner of Montgomery and Sacramento Streets is the former Italian American Bank headquarters by Howard & Galloway that now fronts a leased commercial banking space at 460 Montgomery Street. 

The modern tower retains the classic temple facades at its base. Preserving the two landmark facades took advantage of a new, and at times controversial, urban design precedent as illustrated by other similar projects such as 353 Sacramento and One Sansome Streets. All three of these projects serve to varying degrees of success as examples of a design strategy intended to resolve conflicts between the architectural preservation and development communities.

See also

List of tallest buildings in San Francisco

References

Financial District, San Francisco
Office buildings completed in 1985
Skyscraper office buildings in San Francisco